Accounting and Auditing Organization for Islamic Financial Institutions (AAOIFI) is a Bahrain-based not-for-profit organization that was established to maintain and promote Shariah standards for Islamic financial institutions, participants and the overall industry. The commission also organizes a number of professional development programs (especially the Islamic legal accountant program, observer program and forensic auditing program) in their effort to improve the industry.

History 
AAOIFI was established in accordance with the Agreement of Association which was signed by Islamic financial institutions on 26 February 1990 in Algiers. Then, it was registered on 27 March 1991 in Bahrain. It has members from more than 45 countries, including central banks and Islamic financial institutions and other parties working in the financial industry and banking, Islamic International.

The commission has obtained support for the application of the standards issued by it, where these standards have been applied in the Kingdom of Bahrain and the Dubai International Financial Centre, Jordan, Lebanon, Qatar, Sudan and Syria. The competent authorities in Australia, Indonesia, Malaysia, Pakistan, Saudi Arabia and South Africa issued guidelines derived from the standards and publications.

Organizational structure 
The organizational structure of AAOIFI includes a general assembly. AAOIFI also has a board of trustees and an accounting and auditing standards board each consisting of fifteen part-time members, a Shari'ah committee consisting of four part-time members, an executive committee, and a secretary-general who is a full-time executive and heads the general secretariat.

Objectives 
The objectives of AAOIFI are:
 To develop accounting and auditing thoughts relevant to Islamic financial institutions
 To disseminate accounting and auditing thoughts relevant to Islamic financial institutions and its applications through training, seminars, publication of periodical newsletters, carrying out and commissioning of research and other means
 To prepare, promulgate and interpret accounting and auditing standards for Islamic financial institutions
 To review and amend accounting and auditing standards for Islamic financial institutions
AAOIFI carries out these objectives in accordance with the precepts of Islamic Shari'a which represents a comprehensive system for all aspects of life, in conformity with the environment in which Islamic financial institutions have developed. This activity is intended both to enhance the confidence of users of the financial statements of Islamic financial institutions in the information that is produced about these institutions, and to encourage these users to invest or deposit their funds in Islamic financial institutions and to use their services.

References 

Non-profit organisations based in Bahrain
Islamic economic jurisprudence
Islamic banking